
Achiri (Aymara) is a lake in the La Paz Department, Bolivia.

References 

Lakes of La Paz Department (Bolivia)
Lakes of Bolivia